Breakthrough or break through may refer to:

Arts

Books
 Break Through (book), a 2007 book about environmentalism by Ted Nordhaus and Michael Shellenberger
 Break Through (play), a 2011 episodic play portraying scenes from LGBT life
 The Breakthrough: Immunotherapy and the Race to Cure Cancer, a 2018 book by Charles Graeber
 The Breakthrough: Politics and Race in the Age of Obama, a 2009 book by journalist Gwen Ifill
 "The Breakthrough" (story), a 1971 short story by Daphne du Maurier

Film and television
 Break-through (1944 film), a Canadian documentary film
 Breakthrough (1950 film), an American war film featuring John Agar
 Breakthrough (1986 film), a Soviet disaster film
 Breakthrough (1979 film), a West German war film, sequel to Cross of Iron
 Break Through!, a 2005 Japanese film directed by Kazuyuki Izutsu
 Break-through (2006 film), a Russian drama film
 Breakthrough (2019 film), an American Christian film
 Breakthrough: With Rod Parsley, a 1996 television program featuring Rod Parsley
 Breakthrough (TV series), a 2015 National Geographic Channel television program

Music

Albums
 Break Through (album), a 1990 album by Japanese rock band B'z
 Breakthrough (Colbie Caillat album), 2009
 Breakthrough (George Adams & Don Pullen album), 1986
 Breakthrough (The Gaslamp Killer album), 2012
 Breakthrough! (album), a 1972 album by the Cedar Walton/Hank Mobley Quintet
 The Breakthrough, a 2005 album by American singer Mary J. Blige
 Breakthru', an album by Nidji
 Breakthrough, a 1986 album by American clarinetist Eddie Daniels

Songs
 "Breakthru" (song), a song by Queen from the 1989 album The Miracle
 "Breakthrough" (Aya Hirano song), a 2006 single
 "Breakthrough" (Lemonade Mouth song), a 2011 single
 "Breakthrough" (Twice song), a 2019 single
 "The Breakthrough", by LL Cool J from the 1987 album Bigger and Deffer
 "Breakthrough", by Modest Mouse from the 1996 album This Is a Long Drive for Someone with Nothing to Think About
 "Breakthrough", by Richard Wright from the 1996 album Broken China
 "Breakthrough", by Big Wreck from the 2001 album The Pleasure and the Greed
 "Breakthrough", a 2004 single by Hope 7
 "Break-Thru", by Dirty Projectors from the 2018 album Lamp Lit Prose

Medicine
 Breakthrough infection, a case of illness in which a vaccinated individual becomes sick from the same illness that the vaccine is meant to prevent
 Breakthrough pain, sudden transitory pain that is not controlled by a patient's usual pain management regimen
 Breakthrough seizure, an epileptic seizure in a patient who is taking medicine to prevent seizures

Organizations
 Breakthrough (Dutch political history), a Dutch political movement in the late 1940s
 Breakthrough (human rights), a human rights organization in the U.S. and India
 Breakthrough (Transnistria), a political youth organization in Transnistria
 Breakthrough Party, a democratic socialist British political party

Other
 Breakthrough (board game), an abstract strategy board game
 Breakthrough (military), a situation where an offensive force has broken through an enemy defensive line
 Emergency breakthrough, a function on land-line telephones that allows a caller to interrupt a phone conversation of another caller
 Epiphany (feeling), an experience of sudden enlightenment or of intellectual discovery
 Scrubber breakthrough, a failure mode in rebreathers when the carbon dioxide scrubber is exhausted.
 Tunnel hole-through, also known as breakthrough, when the two ends of a tunnel under construction meet
 Breakthrough role

See also 
 
 Breakthru (disambiguation)
 "Break On Through (To the Other Side)", a song by The Doors